The Good Son may refer to:

 The Good Son, a 1982 novel by American author Craig Nova
 The Good Son, a 2016 novel by You-Jeong Jeong
 The Good Son (album), a 1990 album by Nick Cave and the Bad Seeds
 The Good Son (film), a 1993 psychological thriller starring Elijah Wood and Macaulay Culkin
 The Good Son (1998 film), a short film by Sean McGuire
 The Good Son (TV series), a Filipino family drama television series by ABS-CBN
 "The Good Son" (Frasier), the first episode of the TV series Frasier
 "The Good Son" (NCIS), a ninth season episode of NCIS
 "The Good Son" (That '70s Show), an episode of That '70s Show
 The Good Son: The Life of Ray Boom Boom Mancini, a 2013 documentary.